Antonio Binarelli (16 September 1940 – 12 July 2022) was an Italian magician. He was awarded the Order of Merit of the Italian Republic in the 5th class Knight. Binarelli died on 12 July 2022 of an illness at a hospital in Rome, at the age of 81.

References

External links 

 

1940 births
2022 deaths
People from Rome
Italian magicians
Italian television personalities
Recipients of the Order of Merit of the Italian Republic
Knights of the Order of Merit of the Italian Republic